McAleney is a surname. Notable people with the surname include:

Ed McAleney (born 1953), American footballer
James S. McAleney (born 1969), Canadian jockey

See also
McAlevey